Wda  is a village in the administrative district of Gmina Lubichowo, within Starogard County, Pomeranian Voivodeship, in northern Poland. It is located within the ethnocultural region of Kociewie in the historic region of Pomerania.

The village has a population of 417.

The settlement Pawelec is part of the village.

Wda was a royal village of the Polish Crown, administratively located in the Tczew County in the Pomeranian Voivodeship.

References

Wda